Rosario Salvatore Aitala is an Italian judge and prosecutor specialising in criminal law. Aitala was elected as a judge of the International Criminal Court in 2017, for a mandate from 11 March 2018 to 10 March 2027.

Youth and childhood

Early career
Prior to becoming a judge, Aitala was a police officer.

Judge and prosecutor
Aitala has been a judge and a prosecutor in Milan, Trapani and Rome for three decades, specialising in criminal law cases involving the Mafia, terrorism, corruption and international crime including terrorism.

International Criminal Court judge
On 6 or 8 December 2017, Aitala was elected as a judge of the International Criminal Court (ICC), with 84 votes in favour by states party to the Rome Statute. His term as an ICC judge is from 11 March 2018 to 10 March 2027.

Aitala was a judge of Pre-trial Chamber II during 2018–2021.

Government and international advisor
Aitala has been an advisor to Italian foreign ministers and the president of the Italian Senate. In European Union (EU) roles, Aitala has been Coordinator of the Cocaine Route Monitoring and Support Programme of the European Union, and an advisor for EU assistance missions for justice and monitoring money laundering and economic crime.

Academic career
Aitala has carried out research and teaching in criminal law, geopolitics and international relations at LUISS Guido Carli, Università degli Studi della Campania Luigi Vanvitelli (2006–2014), and University of Rome Tor Vergata.

References

International Criminal Court judges
Living people
Italian judges